, also spelled Korokke!, is a Japanese manga written and illustrated by Manavu Kashimoto. It was published by Shogakukan in CoroCoro Comic from April 2000 to November 2006 and collected in 15 bound volumes. It received the 2003 Shogakukan Manga Award for children's manga.

Croket! was adapted into an anime television series by OLM, broadcast from April 7, 2003 to March 27, 2005, and had a total of 8 video games.

Plot 
The world of Croket! is one inhabited by both humans and exotic creatures such as anthropomorphic animals and where individuals called Bankers travel around the world to collect magical coins called Kinkas with their Kinka Banks. Kinkas are said to activate the appearance of the Bank Wizard, who will grant the wish of any Banker who collects enough Kinkas. The story mainly revolves around Croket, a young and scrappy Banker with incredible strength whose wish is to revive his father, a legendary Banker named Burger, who was said to be killed by a villain Croket knows as the "Black Gown Man."

Shortly after his journey, a tournament called the Banker Survival Quest is told to be held in the small but dangerous Macadamia Island, and the winner earns enough Kinkas to fill the largest Kinka Bank. Setting his eyes on the island, Croket battles against rivals both friendly and malevolent, though there very well may be a dangerous threat in the tournament that haunts fellow competitors and Croket's past.

Characters 
 
 The son of the Legendary Banker Burger and main character of the series. He is very strong and carries a heavy hammer as a weapon. His wish is to revive his father.
 
 Prince of Grand Chef Kingdom.
 
 From a village witch everyone is beautiful, he carries a mask and uses a stick which invokes pink poop.
 
 Croket's pig shaped Kinkas safe.
 Worcester
 An anthropomorphic cat Banker who wants to be the most popular of his village.

Games 
All Croket! video games were published by Konami and none of them was released outside Japan.

References

External links
VIZ Media Europe Croket! page

Shopro (licensor) Official website 
 Croket! Game site by Konami 
Croket! at TV Tokyo's site 

2000 manga
2003 anime television series debuts
Adventure anime and manga
Anime series based on manga
OLM, Inc.
Shogakukan franchises
Shogakukan manga
Shōnen manga
TV Tokyo original programming
Viz Media anime
Winners of the Shogakukan Manga Award for children's manga
Fantasy anime and manga